Srikakulam Lok Sabha constituency is one of the twenty-five lok sabha constituencies of Andhra Pradesh in India. It comprises seven assembly segments and belongs to Srikakulam district .

Assembly segments 

The seven Assembly segments of Srikakulam Lok Sabha constituency are:

Members of Parliament

Election results

2004

2009

2014

2019

See also 
 List of constituencies of the Andhra Pradesh Legislative Assembly

References

External links 
Srikakulam Lok Sabha constituency election 2019 date and schedule

Lok Sabha constituencies in Andhra Pradesh
Srikakulam district